Robert Beecher Howell (January 21, 1864  March 11, 1933) was an American politician. He was born in Adrian, Michigan. He graduated from the United States Naval Academy in Annapolis, Maryland in 1885. Afterwards, he went to the Detroit School of Law. He moved to Omaha, Nebraska for his health in 1888.

A Nebraska progressive Republican, Howell was first a Nebraska state engineer from 1895 to 1896 and an engineer for the city of Omaha from 1896 to 1897.  He was a lieutenant in the United States Navy during the Spanish–American War. He was elected to the state senate in 1902 to 1904, and then served on the Omaha Water Board and its successor, the Metropolitan Utilities District from 1904 to 1923, of which he was the chair from 1912 to 1923. Howell was elected to the Republican National Committee in 1912, 1916, and 1920.

After an unsuccessful bid for Governor of Nebraska in 1914, he served as a lieutenant in the United States Naval Reserve Force from 1917 to 1923. In 1921, he became the chairman of the radio commission in the United States Post Office Department. He was elected to the United States Senate in 1922, where he served until March 11, 1933, when he died in office. During his time in the Senate, he was the chairman of the Committee on Claims (1927 to 1933).

He was married to Alice C. Howell.

See also
 List of United States Congress members who died in office (1900–49)

References

External links
  at the Nebraska State Historical Society
 Robert B. Howell Papers at the Dr. C.C. and Mabel L. Criss Library

1864 births
1933 deaths
Politicians from Omaha, Nebraska
United States Naval Academy alumni
Republican Party Nebraska state senators
People from Adrian, Michigan
Republican Party United States senators from Nebraska
United States Navy officers
Military personnel from Michigan